The 2003 UK & Ireland Greyhound Racing Year was the 78th year of greyhound racing in the United Kingdom and Ireland.

Summary
The industry suffered a huge double blow with the closure of Catford and the English Greyhound Derby fiasco. Catford Stadium, owned by GRA was closed with little warning. The last meeting was on the 5 November leaving the staff, trainers and many others redundant.

Trainers John Simpson, Tony Taylor, Maxine Locke and John Walsh moved to Wimbledon, Keston based Steve Gammon left for Crayford, Sonja Spiers and Kevin Connor went to Sittingbourne and Mark Lavender switched to Portsmouth. Racing Manager Derek Hope was able to take up the same position at Wimbledon soon after because Simon Harris had left for Coventry Stadium bookmaker John Humphreys, who had stood in the main ring since 1966 and sponsored the Gold Collar for 18 years, retired.

The 2003 English Greyhound Derby took place as usual with the final being held on 28 June. The final resulted in the disqualification of Droopys Hewitt, trained by Andy Iaonnou a first season trainer and former head man to Nick Savva. A sample taken by the stewards (the usual practice) was tested as positive and following a six-month court battle the National Greyhound Racing Club stewards finally prevailed and stripped the Derby title from Droopys Hewitt and awarded it to second place Farloe Verdict. The winner Farloe Verdict received £75,000 and the disgraced Iaonnou was banned from the sport.

The 2003 Irish Greyhound Derby suffered no such troubles and was won by Climate Control.

Charlie Lister was Greyhound Trainer of the Year, it was the first time he had taken the honour despite all of his previous success. Brian Clemenson landed the trainers championship for the second successive year. The title of greyhound of the year went to Tims Crow.

Tracks
Dundalk officially opened their new Dundalk Stadium on 29 November 2003 to the cost of €11 million. The minister for sport John O'Donoghue conducted the opening.

William Hill bookmakers purchased Brough Park and it underwent major investment, similar to that of Sunderland, which William Hill had acquired the year before.

Auchinleck in East Ayrshire, a major independent (unlicensed track) closed after seventy years racing. The track was the birthplace of famous Scottish bookmaker Fearless Freddie Williams who had his first pitch there many years ago.

Competitions
Former Springbok champion Rossa Ranger set a new track record over 385 hurdles at Crayford recording a remarkable 23.36, faster than the flat heats of the Rosebowl on the same night. However he failed to make it past the Grand National first round. The event went to Selby Ben continuing Tommy Foster's success in the hurdle classic. Charlie Lister lifted the Scottish Greyhound Derby with new Irish acquisition Micks Mystic. Shelbourne Star lost his St Leger title after a positive test.

News
There was continued debating on two issues; whether a levy should be paid to the sport in place of the Bookmakers contributions and how to increase funding in welfare to ensure that the industry could meet and exceed the requirements set by DEFRA and the Animal Welfare Bill.

Trainer Joe Cobbold died after a long battle with cancer aged 71, his son Trevor Cobbold had died nearly ten years previous with cancer; the Utopia kennels had produced countless champions under the 'Decoy' prefix.

Roll of honour

Principal UK finals

	

+ disqualified after winning the race following a positive drugs test

Principal Irish finals

Totalisator returns

The totalisator returns declared to the National Greyhound Racing Club for the year 2003 are listed below.

References 

Greyhound racing in the United Kingdom
Greyhound racing in the Republic of Ireland
2003 in British sport
2003 in Irish sport